Oliver Dunne (Dublin, 1977) is an Irish head chef and restaurant owner. He is the owner of the Michelin starred restaurant Bon Appétit in Malahide, County Dublin. Dunne was a regular guest in the former Irish TV-show The Afternoon Show.

Dunne started his career as commis at Gotham Café in Dublin. From there he went on to work at other places, including the Peacock Alley, before he left for London. In London he worked for chefs such as Gordon Ramsay and Gary Rhodes.

In 2003, Dunne returned to Ireland. He started working as head chef in restaurant Zucchini in Ranelagh. Within a few weeks, he renamed the place to Mint. In 2006, Dylan McGrath took over the  when Dunne bought Bon Appétit in Malahide. Oliver Dunne was awarded a Michelin star since 2008 for his cooking there.

Besides his work at the restaurant, Dunne also acts as guest-chef for the Dublin Cookery School, an institution for cooking courses.

In August 2013 he opened a new restaurant in the Clarence Hotel, together with Rory Carville.

Trivia
 Dunne lives in Malahide with his wife and two children. In August 2013, Oliver Dunne posted an image on Twitter, posing with a meat cleaver, alongside his colleague Rory Carville holding the bloodied head of food critic, Lucinda O'Sullivan. The image was reported to Gardaí.

References 

Irish chefs
Irish television personalities
Living people
1977 births
Head chefs of Michelin starred restaurants
Irish television chefs
People from Malahide